The Statler Brothers (sometimes simply referred to as The Statlers) were an American country music, gospel, and vocal group from Staunton, Virginia. The quartet was formed in 1955 performing locally, and from 1964 to 1972, they sang as opening act and backup singers for Johnny Cash.

Originally performing Southern gospel music at local churches, the group billed themselves as The Four Star Quartet, and later The Kingsmen. In 1963, when the song "Louie, Louie" by the garage rock band also called The Kingsmen became famous, the group elected to bill themselves as The Statler Brothers.  Despite the name, only two members of the group (Don and Harold Reid) were actual brothers and no member had the surname of Statler. The group actually named themselves after a brand of facial tissue they had noticed in a hotel room (they later quipped that they could just as easily have named themselves "the Kleenex Brothers"). Don Reid sang lead; Harold Reid, Don's older brother, sang bass; Phil Balsley sang baritone; and Lew DeWitt sang tenor and was the guitarist before being replaced due to ill health by Jimmy Fortune in 1982.

The band's style was closely linked to their gospel roots. "We took gospel harmonies," said Harold Reid, "and put them over in country music." Most of their albums contain at least one gospel song, and they produced several containing only gospel. They also recorded a tribute song to The Blackwood Brothers, who influenced their music. The song "We Got Paid by Cash" was written by the Statler Brothers as a tribute to Johnny Cash, who discovered and mentored them.

Career 
Early in the group's history, before the group named themselves The Statler Brothers, Joe McDorman was their lead singer.

The Statlers began their career at a performance at Lyndhurst Methodist Church near their hometown of Staunton, Virginia, under the name The Four Star Quartet. In 1964, they started an eight-year run as Johnny Cash's opening act and backing vocalists. This period of their career was memorialized in their song "We Got Paid by Cash." They were featured regularly on The Johnny Cash Show, his ABC hit that ran from 1969 to 1971. Due to their expanding career, the Statlers left Cash's entourage around the mid-1970s to concentrate on their own career, a departure that took place on good terms.

Two of the Statlers' best-known songs are "Flowers on the Wall," their first major hit that was composed and written by Lew DeWitt, and the socially conscious "Bed of Rose's". In the 1980s, the Statlers were a mainstay on The Nashville Network (TNN), where their videos were shown regularly. Also on TNN, between 1991 and 1998, they hosted The Statler Brothers Show, a weekly variety show, which was the network's top-rated program for its entire 7-year run.

Throughout the Statlers' career, much of their appeal was related to their incorporation of comedy and parody into their musical act, due in large part to the humorous and comedic talent of group member Harold Reid; they were frequently nominated for awards for their comedy as well as their singing. They recorded two comedy albums under the pseudonym Lester "Roadhog" Moran and the Cadillac Cowboys, and one-half of one side of the album Country Music Then and Now was devoted to satirizing small-town radio stations' Saturday-morning shows.

The Statlers earned the number-one spot on the Billboard chart four times, for "Do You Know You Are My Sunshine?" in 1978, "Elizabeth" in 1984, and in 1985, "My Only Love" and "Too Much on My Heart." Since forming, the Statlers have released over 40 albums.

In 1980, the Statler Brothers purchased and renovated their former elementary school, Beverly Manor, in Staunton, occupying the complex for several years. The complex consisted of offices for the group, a small museum and auditorium, and an adjacent building that served as office space for unrelated businesses. A garage was built to store the two tour buses that the group had used for many years. The group has since sold the complex, which Grace Christian Church in Staunton converted back into an academic campus.

In 1970, the group began performing at an annual Independence Day festival in Gypsy Hill Park in Staunton. The event, known as "Happy Birthday USA," lasted for 25 years, and included many country-music figures, including Mel Tillis, Charley Pride, and many others. The event drew as many as 100,000 fans each year. The group also honored their hometown with the song "Staunton, Virginia" on their 1973 album Do You Love Me Tonight.

DeWitt retired from the Statler Brothers in 1982 due to ill health. After a 3-year hiatus, he returned to the music industry as a solo artist until shortly before his death on August 15, 1990, from complications of Crohn's disease, at age 52.

Harold Reid (born on August 21, 1939) died on April 24, 2020, after a long battle with kidney failure, at age 80.

Awards 
Academy of Country Music
 1972 Top Vocal Group
 1977 Top Vocal Group
 2016 Cliffie Stone Pioneer Award

Country Music Association
 1972 Vocal Group of the Year
 1973 Vocal Group of the Year
 1974 Vocal Group of the Year
 1975 Vocal Group of the Year
 1976 Vocal Group of the Year
 1977 Vocal Group of the Year
 1979 Vocal Group of the Year
 1980 Vocal Group of the Year
 1984 Vocal Group of the Year

Country Music Hall of Fame and Museum
 Inducted in 2008

Gospel Hall of Fame
 Inducted in 2007

Grammy Awards
 1965 Best New Country & Western Artist
 1965 Best Contemporary (R&R) Performance – Group (Vocal or Instrumental) – "Flowers on the Wall"
 1972 Best Country Vocal Performance by a Duo or Group – "The Class of '57"

American Music Awards
 Favorite Country Band, Duo or Group 1979
 Favorite Country Band, Duo or Group 1980
 Favorite Country Band, Duo or Group 1981

Retirement 
The group disbanded and retired after completing a farewell tour on October 26, 2002. Balsley and Don Reid continue to reside in Staunton, as did Harold Reid until his death in April 2020;  Fortune, though, relocated to Nashville, where he continues his music career as a solo artist, having released three albums under his own name. The Statlers remain one of the most awarded acts in the history of country music.

Don Reid has pursued a second career as an author. He has written six books of his own. Reid and his sons Donald II "Debo" and Langdon co-wrote You Know It's Christmas When . . . His brother Harold and he co-wrote a history of the Statler Brothers titled Random Memories, released in February 2008. In 2020, Reid wrote a complete anthology of the Statlers' songs, simply titled The Music of the Statler Brothers.

Grandstaff/Wilson Fairchild 
Wil and Langdon Reid, the sons of Harold and Don, respectively, formed a duo in the 1990s, originally performing under the name Grandstaff.  In 2007, Grandstaff recorded "The Statler Brothers Song," a tribute song to the Statlers.

In an interview on Nashville's WSM (AM) on March 25, 2010, Wil Reid said that they decided to change their name to Wilson Fairchild after many people got the name "Grandstaff" wrong during introductions.  The name comes from "Wilson," Wil's middle name, and "Fairchild," Langdon's middle name.

Sisters Kim and Karmen Reid (daughters of Harold) also enjoyed a brief stint as a country duo in the early 1980s, which included a guest appearance on an episode of Hee Haw.

Influence 
The Statler Brothers have been credited as the first country music act to transfer the genre's nostalgia from a rural to a suburban setting. They have also been called "America's Poets" by Kurt Vonnegut. The bluegrass duo Dailey & Vincent often performs with two other members of their band as a quartet in the style of the Statlers, often performing many of the Statlers' hits in their shows. Jimmy Fortune also sometimes tours with Dailey & Vincent.

Members and years active
Joe McDorman – lead (1955–1960)
Lew DeWitt – tenor (1955–1982) (died 1990)
Phil Balsley – baritone (1955–2002)
Harold Reid – bass (1955–2002) (died 2020)
Don Reid – lead (1960–2002)
Jimmy Fortune – tenor (1982–2002)

Discography

References

External links
 The Statler Brothers performing at the Grand ole Opry in 1972
 The Statler Brothers performing a gospel in the Johnny Cash Show during the 1960s
 Official Website
 at CMT
 Jimmy Fortune's Homepage

Country music groups from Virginia
Country Music Hall of Fame inductees
Grammy Award winners
Musical groups from Virginia
Vocal quartets
Musical groups established in 1955
Musical groups disestablished in 2002
Columbia Records artists
Mercury Records artists
1955 establishments in Virginia
2002 disestablishments in Virginia